Evang is a Norwegian surname. Notable people with the surname include:

 Karl Evang (1902–1981), Norwegian physician and civil servant
 Vilhelm Evang (1909–1983), Norwegian military officer

See also
 Evans (surname)

Norwegian-language surnames